Nadine Nassib Njeim (born 7 February 1984) is a Lebanese Tunisian actress and beauty pageant titleholder who was elected Miss Lebanon 2004. She represented her home country in Miss Universe 2005 in Thailand. As of 2021, she is the most followed Lebanese actress on Instagram with more than 16 million followers.

Background
Njeim was born in Beirut to a Lebanese Maronite Christian father, Nassib Njeim, originally from Duris, and a Tunisian Muslim mother. She married Hady Asmar and together they have two children, a daughter and a son. She divorced Asmar in September 2019.

Post-pageant career 
Since passing on her title Miss Lebanon, Njeim has pursued a career in acting, and has been cast in Law and Cello, Samra, 3eshk El Nesa, Nos Yawm, Al Hayba, Tareeq, Khamse w Noss and 2020. She was the first Arab actress nominated to Seoul International Film Festival for Best Actress for her performance in Samra. She discusses her professionalism in acting and films such as Sorry Mom.

Social views and controversy

In 2016, Njeim's views on premarital sex and gender equality, expressed in a 2012 interview on Future TV, rose to relevancy since many found them to be controversial. She said, inter alia: "I want women to stay women. If they equate me with a man, I’d feel like a man. I don’t want to. I want to stay a woman."

In response to the backlash she received, Njeim stated in another interview that she believes the content of the resurfaced clip had been purposely edited to discredit her. She said she supported women's rights and that her message promoted gender equality.

Njeim starred in series one of Al Hayba, but not in seasons 2 and 3 because her role as a woman on the show conformed to gender stereotypes and she wanted her character to be more physically active.

References

1984 births
Actresses from Beirut
Lebanese beauty pageant winners
Lebanese female models
Lebanese television actresses
Lebanese Maronites
Lebanese socialites
Lebanese people of Tunisian descent
Living people
Miss Universe 2005 contestants
Miss World 2004 delegates
Lebanese American University alumni